Patrick McIntyre (1844 – 23 November 1898) was a New Zealand cricketer. He played in one first-class match for Wellington in 1887/88.

See also
 List of Wellington representative cricketers

References

External links
 

1844 births
1898 deaths
New Zealand cricketers
Wellington cricketers
Place of birth missing